The Speaker of the California State Assembly is the presiding officer of the California State Assembly in the chief leadership position, and controls the flow of legislation and committee assignments. The Speaker is nominated by the majority party's caucus and elected by the full Assembly. Meanwhile other floor leaders, such as the majority and minority leaders, are elected by their respective party caucuses according to each party's strength in the chamber. The current Speaker is Democrat Anthony Rendon of the 63rd district.

The speaker formerly had far more power, and was able to issue committee assignments to both parties' members, control State Assembly funds, and had broad administrative authority, but many of these powers were transferred to committee chairs after the speakership of Curt Pringle.

The Speaker of the Assembly is also third in the order of succession to the Governor of California, after the Lieutenant Governor and the President pro tempore of the California State Senate.

List of former Speakers
The following is a list of speakers of the California State Assembly. It does not number those individuals who served abbreviated terms or those who served during an extraordinary session called by the Governor of California for a narrowly-defined agenda.

  The First California Legislature was nonpartisan.
  Estee was also a Republican, but he was elected to the term in which he was Speaker as an independent.
  Young was elected as a Republican during the 40th and 42nd sessions (1913 and 1917), but a Progressive during the 41st session (1915).
  McCarthy's 19th District was renumbered the 18th District after the 1970s redistricting.
  Brown's 17th District was renumbered the 13th District after the 1990s redistricting.
  Allen and Setencich were Republican Assemblymembers whom Democrats elected after losing their majority in the chamber.
  Perez's 46th District was renumbered the 53rd District after the 2010s redistricting.

See also
 California State Assembly
 List of California state legislatures
 President pro tempore of the California State Senate
 President of the Los Angeles City Council

References

 
 
 

California State Legislature
 
Speakers of the California State Assembly
California